John Wikström (May 21, 1903 – February 5, 1991) was a Swedish cross-country skier who competed in the 1920s. He won a silver medal at the 1927 FIS Nordic World Ski Championships in the 50 km event.

Cross-country skiing results
All results are sourced from the International Ski Federation (FIS).

World Championships
 1 medal – (1 silver)

References

External links

Swedish male cross-country skiers
Place of birth missing
FIS Nordic World Ski Championships medalists in cross-country skiing
1903 births
1991 deaths